The Maryland county executive elections of 2014 were held on November 4, 2014. Democratic and Republican primaries were held on June 24, 2014.

Anne Arundel County, Baltimore County, Frederick County, Harford County, Howard County, Montgomery County, Prince George's County, and Wicomico County elected county executives.

Anne Arundel County 
The incumbent County Executive is Republican Laura Neuman, who was named county executive following the suspension of John R. Leopold on January 29, 2013. She is seeking her first full term.

Republican primary

Nominee
 Steve Schuh, state delegate from the 31st district (2007–present)

Eliminated in primary
 Laura Neuman, incumbent county executive (2013–present)

Results

Democratic primary

Nominee
 George F. Johnson IV, former Anne Arundel County sheriff (1994–2006) and candidate for county executive in 2006

Withdrew
 Joanna Conti, former Colorado congressional candidate, businesswoman, and nominee for county executive in 2010

Results

General election

Results

Baltimore County 
The incumbent County Executive is Democrat Kevin Kamenetz, who was elected in 2010 with 53.7% of the vote. He is eligible for re-election and is running for a second term.

Democratic primary

Nominee
 Kevin Kamenetz, incumbent county executive (2010–present)

Eliminated in primary
 Kevin Francis Marron

Results

Republican primary

Nominee
 George Harman, environmental consultant

Eliminated in primary
 Tony Campbell, Towson University professor
 Gregory Prush

Withdrawn
 Timothy Tenne

Results

Independent candidates
 Tony Solesky (Independent), legal advocate

General election

Results

Frederick County 
On December 1, 2014, the Frederick County government transitioned to a "charter home rule government" following voters' approval of a ballot referendum for the transition during the 2012 elections. Therefore, there is no incumbent county executive.

Democratic primary

Nominee
 Jan Gardner, county commissioner (1998–present) and former county commission president (2006–2010)

Results

Republican primary

Nominee
 Blaine Young, county commission president (2010–present) and former county commissioner (2010)

Eliminated in primary
 Mark Sweadner
 David Gray

Results

General election

Results

Harford County 
The incumbent County Executive is Democrat David R. Craig, who was re-elected in 2010 with 79.3% of the vote. He is term-limited and cannot run for re-election to a third term.

Republican primary

Nominee
 Barry Glassman, state senator from the 35th district (2008–present) and former state delegate from district 35A (1999–2008)

Results

Democratic primary

Nominee
 Joe Werner, perennial candidate

Results

General election

Results

Howard County 
The incumbent County Executive is Democrat Kenneth Ulman, who was re-elected in 2010 with 62.5% of the vote. He is term-limited and cannot run for re-election to a third term.

Democratic primary

Nominee
 Courtney Watson, Howard County Councilmember (2006–present)

Results

Republican primary

Nominee
 Allan H. Kittleman, state senator from the 9th district (2004–present)

Results

General election

Results

Montgomery County 
The incumbent County Executive is Democrat Ike Leggett, who was re-elected in 2010 with 65.6% of the vote. He is eligible for re-election and is running for a third term.

Democratic primary

Nominee
 Ike Leggett, incumbent county executive (2006–present)

Eliminated in primary
 Doug Duncan, former Montgomery County executive (1994–2006) and candidate for governor in 2006
 Phil Andrews, Montgomery County councilmember (1998–present)

Results

Republican primary

Nominee
 Jim Shalleck, candidate for Montgomery County State's Attorney in 2006

Results

General election

Results

Prince George's County 
The incumbent County Executive is Democrat Rushern Baker, who was elected in 2010 with 99.3% of the vote. He is eligible for re-election and is running for a second term.

Democratic primary

Nominee
 Rushern Baker, incumbent county executive (2010–present)

Results

General election

Results

Wicomico County 
The incumbent County Executive is Democrat Richard Pollitt, who was re-elected in 2010 with 51.5% of the vote. He is eligible for re-election and is running for a third term.

Democratic primary

Nominee
 Richard M. Pollitt Jr., incumbent county executive (2006–present)

Results

Republican primary

Nominee
 Bob Culver, Wicomico County councilmember (2010–present)

Results

General election

Results

References

County executives
Maryland county executives